Neeraj Gupta (born 1969) is an Indian sculptor. He took second prize in the sculpture section of the Florence Biennale in 2017, one of over a hundred winners in eleven sections. Gupta became the first Indian artist to win Florence Biennale Award. Keshav Malik was his guru.

In 2004 he won the Sahitya Kala Parishad award at the 28th Annual Art Exhibition, Govt. of N.C.T. of Delhi. Gupta is the founder and president of Delhi Art Society.

Neeraj Gupta is also one of the finalists of Woollahra Small Sculpture Prize 2018 out of 666 entries.

In 2019, Neeraj Gupta became the member of Royal Society of Sculptors, United Kingdom.

Neeraj Gupta's art "From Here to Eternity" was selected for 8th Beijing International Art Biennale China 2019.

Neeraj Gupta is one of the winners (3rd place) of International Art & Design Competition 2020.

In February 2020, Gupta organised a public art exhibition "Sculpt for Delhi III" presented by Delhi Art Society. The seven days art exhibition featured works of 20 sculpture artists from across the India.

In 2021, Gupta was nominated for 9th Gwangju Biennale South Korea.

Public exhibitions 
Oak Bay Arts, 2020 Arts Alive Sculpture Walk, Public Art Program at Vancouver, Canada
2019 Jerusalem Biennale
NDMC Convention Centre near Jantar Mantar
South Block, Central Atrium of D.R.D.O. HD. QRTS Nehru Park New Delhi 
Santorini Biennale, Greece 2016
"Folk Strangers" at Visual Art Gallery, India Habitat Centre 2015
Isculpt, India International Centre 2016
Breath Better Together in India International Centre 2015
Kaya Kalap at India Habitat Centre, Visual Arts Gallery in Jan 2013
Kalyug, Lalit Kala Akademi, New Delhi 2003
Sculpt for Delhi in India International Centre 2018
"Delhi for Sculpt II" inaugurated by Delhi Lieutenant Governor Anil Baijal and Bulgarian ambassador Eleonora Dimitrova
"Sculpt for Delhi III" 2020 at India Habitat Centre, New Delhi

Awards
2019 Eminent Artist of India in the 60th National Exhibition of Art by Lalit Kala Academy (National Academy of Art)
2017 Silver Medal in Florence Biennale Award
Sahitya Kala Parishad Award, 28th Annual Art Exhibition, 2004
Finalist for Woollahra Small Sculpture Prize 2018 out of 666 entries 2018.
Wildlife Artist of the Year 2021 by David Shepherd Wildlife Foundation

Documentary Bibliography
20 Solutions, Artist Response to Climate Change, released on the eve of Climate Summit in PARIS by Environment Minister, Govt. of India 2015
Documentary on Singasth Kumbh 20

References

External links 
 

Living people
Modern sculptors
1969 births
Indian male sculptors
Indian contemporary sculptors
21st-century Indian sculptors
20th-century Indian sculptors
Artists from Delhi
20th-century Indian male artists
21st-century Indian male artists